was a Japanese naturalist, zoologist and entomologist.

He was physician to the 11th Tokugawa shōgun Tokugawa Ienari Kurimoto Masayoshi lectured on Materia Medica. In 1811 he wrote Kurimoto’s Iconographia Insectorum which records 500 Japanese insects. In 1826 he met Philipp Franz von Siebold and they worked together. Kurimoto Masayoshi gave him drawings of Crustacea. One of these Squilla maculata a Mantis shrimp was used by Wilhem de Haan in Siebold's Fauna Japonica.

References
Ueno Masuzo (year?) Japanese entomology in the first half of the nineteenth century  Japanese journal of entomology
Vol.27, No.1(19590315) pp. 4–9 The Entomological Society of Japan 

 Kaikarui Shashin (pictures of crustaceans) at Leiden University Libraries See catalogue
 Gyorui shasin (pictures of fish) at Leiden University Libraries See catalogue 

Japanese entomologists
1756 births
1834 deaths